Vladimir Muravlev (Russian: Владимир Муравлёв) is a Russian ballet dancer, born 10 January 1974 in Tashkent (Uzbekistan). He is a grandson of Ural Tansykbayev. He has a degree in Performing Arts from the Uzbek Academic Ballet School (1993) under the tutelage balletmaster Kurkmas Sagatov; RATI - GITIS (2007). He is currently a Principal Dancer with the Moscow Classical Ballet.

Muravlev has partnered some of today's most renowned ballerinas, including Tamara Rojo, Galina Shlyapina, Lyudmila Vasilieva, Ekaterina Berezina, Olga Pavlova, Marina Rzhannikova.

Debuts 
 1996  -  Count Almaviva in Dmitry Bryantsev's Bravo!Figaro (based on Beaumarchais' Mariage de Figaro)  at Stanislavsky and Nemirovich-Danchenko Moscow Academic Music Theatre  (Moscow Stanislavsky Ballet) 
 1997 -  Count Albrecht in Giselle at The State Academic Alisher Navoi Opera & Ballet Theatre (Tashkent,  Uzbekistan, dedicated to the 50-year anniversary of the Uzbek Academic Ballet School 
 1998  - Prince in Derek Deane's The Nutcracker at the English National Ballet  in London (United Kingdom) 
 1998  - Prince / Prince's Friend in Michael Corder's Cinderella at the English National Ballet  in London (United Kingdom) 
 2002 - Prince Siegfried in Irek Mukhamedov's  new production of Swan Lake at the Teatr Wielki – Polish National Opera (Warsaw, Poland)

Roles 
 Prince Désiré / The Bluebird  - Sleeping Beauty ( - La Belle au Bois dormant)
 Prince Siegfried / Benno / Venetian Dance (soloist) - Swan Lake, 
 Prince / Tanzmeister - Cinderella
 Count Albrecht - Giselle
 Nutcracker Prince - The Nutcracker
 Basil / Gamache - Don Quixote
 Mercutio / Paris- Romeo and Juliet
 Colas - La Fille Mal Gardée
 Marcus Lucinius Crassus - Spartacus
 Pushkin, the  Poet - Pushkin (a.k.a. - Pushkin – Reflections of the Poet)
 Rudi -  Le Baiser de la fée (a.k.a. - The Fairy’s Kiss; The Ice Maiden)
 Mandarin - The Miraculous Mandarin
 Lead Role -  Strauss-Gala (a.k.a. - The Tricks of Terpsichore)
 Narcissus

Awards 
 1994 - International Ballet Competition «Arabesque»  (Perm, Russia) / Bronze Medal
 1997 - Moscow International Ballet Competition (Moscow, Russia) / Diploma
 1997 - World Art Festival (Los Angeles, United States) /Champion of World Art Festival - Grand Prix and Gold Medal 
 2002 - International Festival of Dance & Music (Bangkok, Thailand) / Prize for Elegance by Swiss watch company "LONGINES"
 2006 - Medal "Honour and advantage" of the International Welfare Foundation ART'S PATRONS OF CENTURY
 2009 - Honoured Artist of Russia

See also
 List of Russian ballet dancers

External links
  Official web site of Vladimir Muravlev
  Official web site of Moscow Classical Ballet 

Russian male ballet dancers
1974 births
Living people
Dancers from Tashkent
English National Ballet